Attagenini is a tribe of carpet beetles in the family Dermestidae. There are at least 4 genera and 20 described species in Attagenini. Attagenini was previously considered a subfamily of Dermestidae called Attageninae, but was reduced in rank to tribe in 2003.

Genera
These four genera belong to the tribe Attagenini:
 Attagenus Latreille, 1802 i c g b (black carpet beetles)
 Egidyella Reitter, 1899 i c g
 Novelsis Casey, 1900 i c g b
 Paranovelsis b
Data sources: i = ITIS, c = Catalogue of Life, g = GBIF, b = Bugguide.net

References

Further reading

External links

 

Dermestidae
Articles created by Qbugbot